Warm, in Your Coat is a Romeo Void compilation album released in 1992.

Track listing
 "White Sweater" (Debora Iyall, Peter Woods, Frank Zincavage) – 4:48
 "I Mean It" (Benjamin Bossi, Iyall, Woods, Zincavage) – 5:40
 "Charred Remains" (Iyall, Woods, Zincavage) – 3:04
 "Talk Dirty to Me (Iyall, Woods, Zincavage) – 4:47
 "Myself to Myself" (Iyall, Woods, Zincavage) – 3:44
 "In the Dark" (Bossi, Larry Carter, Iyall, Woods, Zincavage) – 4:27
 "A Girl in Trouble (Is a Temporary Thing)" (Iyall, Woods, Zincavage, David Kahne) – 4:18
 "Out on My Own" [dance mix] (Iyall, Kahne, Woods, Zincavage) – 5:12
 "Just Too Easy" (Iyall, Woods, Zincavage, Kahne) – 3:12
 "Wrap It Up" (Isaac Hayes, David Porter) – 3:25
 "Flashflood" (Bossi, Carter, Iyall, Woods, Zincavage) – 4:57
 "Undercover Kept" (Bossi, Carter, Iyall, Woods, Zincavage) – 6:08
 "Chinatown" (Bossi, Carter, Iyall, Woods, Zincavage) – 3:16
 "Never Say Never" (Bossi, Carter, Iyall, Woods, Zincavage) – 5:54
 "One Thousand Shadows" [previously unreleased] (Bossi, Iyall, Woods, Zincavage) – 3:29

Personnel
Debora Iyall – vocals
Peter Woods –  guitar
Benjamin Bossi – saxophone
Frank Zincavage – bass
John Haines – drums, percussion (tracks 1–5)
Larry Carter – drums, percussion on (tracks 6 and 10–14)
Aaron Smith – drums, percussion (tracks 7–9)

References

Romeo Void albums
Albums produced by David Kahne
Albums produced by Ric Ocasek
1992 compilation albums
Columbia Records compilation albums